The 2021 H1 Unlimited season is the sixty-fifth running of the H1 Unlimited series for unlimited hydroplanes, sanctioned by the APBA. The 2020 season would have been the sixty-fifth running but that season was cancelled because of COVID-19.

Teams and drivers 

Note: Ṫ—The U-3 is the only piston powered boat in the fleet, powered by a dual turbocharged Allison V-12.

Summary 
The 2021 opened with the Guntersville Lake Hydrofest held at Guntersville, AL on June 26–27. J. Michael Kelly took home the Southern Cup Trophy for First Place Driver.

The second race was the APBA Gold Cup held at the Madison, IN Regatta on July 2–4. Jimmy Shane, driving Miss HomeStreet, captured his fifth Gold Cup victory Sunday in H1 Unlimited Racing Series on the Ohio River in Madison, Indiana. His victory in the 111th running of the event was the fifth in his career, putting him fourth on the list of all-time Gold Cup champions, tied with the legendary Gar Wood. Shane grabbed the inside lane at the start of the winner-take-all final heat and was never challenged. Andrew Tate, driving Graham Trucking, took second in the final heat and third-place honors went to Corey Peabody, driving Pinnacle Peak Consulting.

The third race was the HAPO Columbia Cup held at Tri-Cities, WA on July 23–25. Corey Peabody in the U-9 Pinnacle Peak Racing boat finished first. It's Peabody's first H1 Unlimited victory. J. Michael Kelly, driving the U-8 Miss Tri-Cities boat, finished second. Jimmy Shane, driving Miss HomeStreet, was forced to grab lane 5 on the outside before the race began and finished third.

The fourth and final race of the season was the San Diego Bayfair on September 17–19. On Saturday, September 18, Jimmy Shane drove the U-1 HomeStreet Bank to two heat wins to clinch the team national high points championship. In Sunday's final, J. Michael Kelly driving the U-8 Miss Tri-Cities is won the 2021 Bill Muncey Cup on Mission Bay and also won the National Drivers High Point Championship. Kelly was awarded the victory in San Diego after it was determined that Dave Villwock in the U-40 Beacon Plumbing — after crossing the finish line first in the final — was disqualified for going under 80 mph in the pre-race setup period. Because he jumped the gun, the U-1 Miss Homestreet driven by Jimmy Shane was given a one lap penalty. Shane was awarded second.

Season schedule and results 

Both the HomeStreet Bank Cup and Detroit Hydrofest were cancelled due to the COVID-19 pandemic.

National High Points Standings

References 

H1 Unlimited
H1 Unlimited seasons
Hydro
Hydro